Happy is an American situation comedy that aired on NBC during the summer of 1960 and winter and spring of 1961. The series depicts the events at a motel in Palm Springs, California, run by a young married couple with commentary provided by the voiced thoughts of their infant son.

Synopsis
Chris and Sally Day are a young married couple who are co-owners along with Clara Mason of the Desert Palm Motel or Desert Palms Hotel (according to different sources), an upscale resort in Palm Springs, California. When they got married in 1957, they spent their honeymoon in Palm Springs and stayed in Room 7 of the Desert Palm, where two dozen yellow roses, a bowl of floating gardenias, and a wedding cake with a bride and groom on top greeted them. Chris later learned that the Desert Palm′s owner, Clara Mason, was looking for someone to run it for her and inquired about the position. Clara hired Chris and offered Chris and Sally an opportunity to buy part-ownership in the Desert Palm.

By 1960, Chris and Sally own 10 percent of the Desert Palm, and Chris is its manager. Clara is in romantic pursuit of Sally's uncle, Charlie Dooley, who also lives on the premises and tries to help with the motel; although he is well-intentioned, his efforts often lead to complications for Chris and Sally. Joe and Terry Brigham are a married couple and are friends of Chris's and Sally's.

Witnessing it all is the Days' infant son Christopher Hapgood Day, known as "Happy." Happy communicates his feelings about what he sees to the audience not only through his facial expressions, but also through his thoughts, spoken by an off-camera voice.

Cast
 David Born/Steven Born...Christopher Hapgood "Happy" Day
 Ronnie Burns...Chris Day
 Yvonne Lime...Sally Day
 Lloyd Corrigan...Uncle Charlie Dooley
 Doris Packer...Clara Mason 
 Burt Metcalfe...Joe Brigham
 Wanda Shannon...Terry Brigham
 Leone Ledoux...Happy's voice

Production

Roncom Video Film Productions produced Happy. Twin boys, David and Steven Born, portrayed Happy on camera, and Leone Ledoux provided Happy's off-camera voice. Twenty-six episodes were produced.

Happy′s premise of a narrating baby was borrowed from that of an earlier series, The People's Choice, in which the thoughts of a Basset Hound provided comments on the plot. It was a familiar format for Ronnie Burns, the adopted son of George Burns and Gracie Allen; he had appeared on The George Burns and Gracie Allen Show, in which George Burns's off-camera voice narrated each episode.

The talking baby idea was later revived in the 1989 movie Look Who's Talking and its 1990 sequel Look Who's Talking Too, as well as in the 1991–1992 television series Baby Talk.

Broadcast history

Happy premiered on NBC on June 8, 1960, as a summer replacement series for the first half hour of The Perry Como Show; the second half hour was filled by the Western series Tate. Happy ran that summer on Wednesdays at 9:00 p.m. Eastern Time for 13 episodes, the last of which aired on September 14, 1960. The show returned to the air for a second season on January 13, 1961, this time running on Fridays at 7:30 p.m. Eastern Time. Thirteen more new episodes aired, the last of them on April 7, 1961. Prime-time reruns of Happy then were broadcast until September 28, 1961.

Episodes

Season 1 (1960)
SOURCES

Season 2 (1961)
SOURCES

References

External links
 
 Happy opening credits on YouTube

1960s American sitcoms
1960 American television series debuts
1961 American television series endings
Black-and-white American television shows
NBC original programming
Television shows set in Palm Springs, California
English-language television shows